Sphicosa is a genus of flies in the family Empididae.

Species
S. albipennis Smith, 1962
S. coriacea (Bigot, 1889)
S. globosa Smith, 1962
S. lecta Collin, 1933
S. longirostris Smith, 1962
S. nigra Philippi, 1865
S. plaumanni Smith, 1962
S. setipalpis Smith, 1962
S. uniseta Smith, 1962

References

Empidoidea genera
Empididae